The First Years is a Dutch mockumentary series, sometimes described as a "scripted reality" series, about students at a junior high school. The first episode aired on May 26, 2014 by NPO Zapp.

The 2019 film Brugklas: De tijd van m'n leven is based on this television series.

Cast
Britt Scholte as Anouk (S1-5)
Niek Roozen as Max (S1-5)
Chloe Maessen as Fien (S1-6)
Birgit Kunstt as Bo (S4-6)
May Hollerman (S3-6)
Edwin Bakker as Mats (S4-5)
Bickel Krabbe (S3-4)
Vincent Visser (S6)
Sterre van Woudenberg (S5-6)
Sonia Eijken as Safa (S2-6)
Belle Zimmerman (S2-6)
Leonard Schoots (S2-4)
Fleur Verwey as Joy (S5-6)
Kiek Katerina as Kim (S5-6)

References

2010s Dutch television series
NPO 3 original programming